Blue Tower Hotel is a four-star hotel located on Hamra Street, Damascus, Syria. It has 59 rooms, one restaurant, one café and one bar. The hotel was opened in late 2007.

References

Hotels in Damascus
2007 establishments in Syria
Hotels established in 2007
Hotel buildings completed in 2007